Alexandru "Alex" Munteanu (born 31 October 1987) is a Romanian footballer who plays as a midfielder for Gloria Buzău.

References

External links
Alex Muntean at Liga1.ro

1988 births
Living people
Romanian footballers
Association football midfielders
Liga I players
Liga II players
CS Gaz Metan Mediaș players
ACS Poli Timișoara players
FC Dunărea Călărași players
FC Petrolul Ploiești players
SSU Politehnica Timișoara players
Category;FC Gloria Buzău players